White coal is a form of fuel produced by drying chopped wood over a fire. It differs from charcoal which is carbonised wood. White coal was used in England to melt lead ore from the mid-sixteenth to the late seventeenth centuries. It produces more heat than green wood but less than charcoal and thus prevents the lead evaporating. White coal could be used mixed with charcoal for other industrial uses than lead smelting. White coal was produced in distinctive circular pits with a channel, known as Q-pits. They are frequently found in the woods of South Yorkshire.

Production
Although traditionally made by drying chopped wood, white coal can be made from numerous waste products, most of which are formed into briquettes. Raw materials which can be used include:
 Groundnut shells
 Cotton hulls and stalks
 Castor seed shells
 Forest leaves; wood chips and shavings
 Sugarcane bagasse
 Rice husk and paddy straw
 Mustard waste
 Coir dust
 Coffee husk 
 Sunflower waste
 Maize stalks 
 Bajra (pearl millet) cobs
 Sesame seeds oil cake 
 Wheat straw

Benefits
Producers of white coal proclaim the following benefits from using the fuel:

 White coal is cheaper than coal and fire wood.
 There is no sulphur in the white coal, therefore no toxic gases.
 Moisture content is nil.
 Biomass briquettes have a higher practical thermal value.
 Briquettes have consistent quality, have high burning efficiency, and are ideally sized for complete combustion.
 Combustion is more uniform compared to coal and boiler response to changes in steam requirements is faster, due to higher quantity of volatile matter in briquettes.
 Low ash contents.
 The calorific value of the finished briquettes is approximately 3500 to 4000 kcal/kg.

India is fast becoming a major manufacturer and consumer of white coal. A large number of companies have switched their boiler fuels to use white coal instead of fossil fuels. White coal manufacturing capacity is increasing in the state of Gujarat, Maharashtra, Tamil Nadu and Rajasthan.

The production of white coal (briquettes made of biomass) using agricultural and forest waste is more common in North India.

See also
Solid biofuels

References

External links
 Jaipur Green Fuels
 Green Fuels 

Fuels